The Tatra 75 is a Czechoslovak mid-size car that Tatra introduced in 1933 as the successor to the Tatra 54.

The front-mounted 1,688 cc air-cooled OHV air-cooled boxer engine produces .

Attention was paid to weight reduction, with light alloy used for the cylinder head castings. In common with other Tatras of this time, the 75 had four-speed transmission and rear-wheel drive.

The car was offered with a range of bodies including two- and four-door sedans and convertibles and a six-seat limousine with a longer wheelbase. In its nine-year production run 4,501 Tatra 75s were built. After the Second World War, in 1947, the model was belatedly replaced with the radically different Tatra 600 "Tatraplan".

References

Sources

1940s cars
Cars powered by boxer engines
Automobiles with backbone chassis
Cars introduced in 1933
75